Francesco Saverio Romano (born 24 December 1964) is an Italian politician and lawyer. He served as the minister of agricultures in 2011 and a member of the Chamber of Deputies between 2001 and 2018.

Early life and education
Romano was born in Palermo on 24 December 1964. He holds a law degree, which he received from the University of Palermo in 1988. He was a board member of the Opera Universitaria. He joined the Christian Democracy party when he was a university student.

Career
Romano became a member of the provincial council of Palermo in 1990. From 1993 to 1994 he served as the councillor for viability. From 1997 to 2001 he was the president of IRCAC, a credit institution in Sicily. He was elected to the Chamber of Deputies from his constituency, Bagheria, in 2001. He was the secretary of state for labour in the third cabinet of Silvio Berlusconi. He was reelected to the Chamber in the 2008 elections. Romano left Christian Democracy party in September 2010.

On 23 March 2011, he was appointed agriculture minister to the fourth cabinet led by Berlusconi in a cabinet reshuffle. Romano replaced Giancarlo Galan in the post. He was sworn in as agriculture minister despite being under investigation due to allegations about Mafia association and corruption. Romano's term ended on 16 November 2011 when he was replaced by Mario Catania as agriculture minister.

References

External links

20th-century Italian lawyers
21st-century Italian lawyers
1964 births
Living people
Politicians from Palermo
University of Palermo alumni
Agriculture ministers of Italy
Deputies of Legislature XIV of Italy
Christian Democracy (Italy) politicians
Italian People's Party (1994) politicians
United Christian Democrats politicians
The Populars of Italy Tomorrow politicians
Deputies of Legislature XVI of Italy